Qullpa K'uchu or Qullpak'uchu (Quechua qullpa salpeter, k'uchu corner "salpeter corner", Hispanicized spelling Cullpacucho) is a mountain in the Wansu mountain range in the Andes of Peru, about  high. It is situated in the Arequipa Region, La Unión Province, Puyca District, and in the Cusco Region, Chumbivilcas Province, Santo Tomás District, and in the La Unión Province, Puyca District. It lies east of the mountain Minasniyuq.

It is an important tributary of the Apurímac River, the source of the Amazon River.

See also 
 Kunturillu

References 

Mountains of Peru
Mountains of Arequipa Region
Mountains of Cusco Region